Quantum materials is an umbrella term in condensed matter physics that encompasses all materials whose essential properties cannot be described in terms of semiclassical particles and low-level quantum mechanics. These are materials that present strong electronic correlations or some type of electronic order, such as superconducting or magnetic orders, or materials whose electronic properties are linked to non-generic quantum effects – topological insulators, Dirac electron systems such as graphene, as well as systems whose collective properties are governed by genuinely quantum behavior, such as ultra-cold atoms, cold excitons, polaritons, and so forth. On the microscopic level, four fundamental degrees of freedom – that of charge, spin, orbit and lattice – become intertwined, resulting in complex electronic states; the concept of emergence is a common thread in the study of quantum materials. 

Quantum materials exhibit puzzling properties with no counterpart in the macroscopic world: quantum entanglement, quantum fluctuations, robust boundary states dependent on the topology of the materials' bulk wave functions, etc. Quantum anomalies such as the chiral magnetic effect link some quantum materials with processes in high-energy physics of quark-gluon plasmas.

History 
In 2012, Joseph Orenstein published an article in Physics Today about "ultrafast spectroscopy of quantum materials".  Orenstein stated, As a paradigmatic example, Orenstein refers to the breakdown of Landau Fermi liquid theory due to strong correlations.   The use of the term "quantum materials" has been extended and applied to other systems, such as topological insulators, and Dirac electron materials. The term has  gained momentum since the article "The rise of quantum materials" was published in Nature Physics in 2016. Quoting:

References 

Condensed matter physics
Materials science
Quantum mechanics